Tanby is a rural locality in the Livingstone Shire, Queensland, Australia.

The Rockhampton–Emu Park Road runs through the southern tip.

References 

Shire of Livingstone
Localities in Queensland